"Only One" is a song by American recording artist Kanye West, featuring English musician Paul McCartney. The song was released on December 31, 2014, and was the first song released by West after the release of his sixth studio album Yeezus (2013).

The song was written by artists Noah Goldstein, Mike Dean, and Kirby Lauryen. Produced by the former four, the song is a tribute to West's daughter, North, and is sung as a message to Kanye from the perspective of his late mother, Donda West. McCartney is featured on the track as a musician and can be heard on "faint" and electronically manipulated backing vocals, but does not sing any lead vocal part.

Background
The song was recorded over a two-day period in Mexico in September 2014 in which West and McCartney, alongside other artists, recorded upwards of nine songs.

The track was released on December 31, 2014, to the iTunes Store. The track features English musician and former member of the Beatles and Wings, Paul McCartney, and was the first of two rumored collaborations between the two artists, the other being a track called "Piss On Your Grave". "Only One" was the first of three McCartney–West collaborations to be released commercially, as the two would later appear on "FourFiveSeconds" alongside singer Rihanna, released just twenty-four days after "Only One", as well as on West's "All Day". "Only One" also features uncredited vocals from Ty Dolla $ign.

Kanye West is described in a press release as not being able to remember singing the words to "Only One" when he and McCartney were later reviewing the early 2014 sessions that generated the song. Later, West "realized that perhaps the words had never really come from him … he understood in that moment that his late mother, Dr. Donda West, who was also his mentor, confidante, and best friend, had spoken through him that day ... A message had been passed down through generations." In the song Kanye is singing from the perspective of his mother Donda West, who died in 2007.

West's then-wife Kim Kardashian tweeted upon the release of the track that it is her favorite track by West, saying, "People always ask me what my favorite Kanye song is and it's 'Only One'. Kanye feels like his mom sang thru him to our daughter."

Live performances
 57th Annual Grammy Awards (February 8, 2015)	
 Saturday Night Live (February 15, 2015)
 Skavlan (February 27, 2015)
 The Jonathan Ross Show (March 15, 2015)

Personnel

Kanye West - vocals
Paul McCartney - electric piano, backing vocals

Music video
On the episode of The Ellen DeGeneres Show which aired January 29, 2015, West revealed a preview of the music video for "Only One", directed by Spike Jonze on his iPhone. West tweeted a link to the full music video available to watch on his web site later the same day. The video was shot in the minimalist style that West had been continuously using. It sees West walking through a soggy field with his daughter North, who was 18 months old at the time, and he is silhouetted by fog. Pitchfork Media named "Only One" the sixth best music video of 2015.

Chart performance
"Only One" debuted at number 35 on the Billboard Hot 100 on the chart dated January 17, 2015. Its debut was mainly on the strength of digital download sales; it sold 125,000 copies during its first week, making it the week's tenth-best selling single. It also marked McCartney's first top 40 hit in the United States in over 25 years, when 1989's "My Brave Face" had reached number 25. Following three weeks on sale in the United States, "Only One" had sold 230,000 total copies. On 28 July 2015, the song was certified Gold by the Recording Industry Association of America.

The song also debuted at number 35 in the UK Singles Chart on the chart dated January 10, 2015. On its second week on the chart, the song rose to number 28.

In New Zealand, the song debuted at number 8 on the New Zealand Singles Chart, marking West's first top ten single there since Jay-Z's 2009 single "Run This Town", and first top ten as a lead artist since 2008's "Heartless". It also marks Paul McCartney's first charting single there since his 1993 single "Hope of Deliverance" and first top ten single since 1983's "Say Say Say" with Michael Jackson.

Charts

Weekly charts

Year-end charts

Certifications

Release history

See also
List of UK R&B Singles Chart number ones of 2015

References

External links

 Review of Only One at The Beatles Bible

2014 singles
2014 songs
Def Jam Recordings singles
Kanye West songs
Music videos directed by Spike Jonze
Paul McCartney songs
Roc-A-Fella Records singles
Song recordings produced by Kanye West
Songs written by Kanye West
Songs written by Paul McCartney
Soul ballads
Songs about parenthood
2010s ballads
Songs written by Kirby Lauryen